Chauna is a genus of birds in the screamer family. Its two members are found in wetlands of South America.

Description
They are large, bulky birds, with a small downy head, long legs and large feet which are only partially webbed. They have large spurs on their wings which are used in fights over mates and territorial disputes.

Conservation
The southern screamer is overall fairly common and sometimes considered a pest as it raids crops and competes with farm birds for food. In contrast, the northern screamer is relatively rare and therefore considered near threatened.

Species

References

Anhimidae
Bird genera